The International Association for Pattern Recognition (IAPR), founded in 1978 by Purdue University computer scientist King-Sun Fu, is an international association of non-profit, scientific, or professional organizations (being national, multi-national, or international in scope) concerned with pattern recognition, computer vision, and image processing in a broad sense. Normally, only one organization is admitted from any one country, and individuals interested in taking part in IAPR's activities may do so by joining their national organization.

Publications
The IAPR publishes four main academic publications of record:
The IAPR Newsletter is published quarterly
Pattern Recognition Letters is published monthly by Elsevier (ISSN 0167-8655) 
Machine Vision and Applications is published bimonthly by Springer Verlag
International Journal on Document Analysis and Recognition is published quarterly by Springer Verlag

Conferences
IAPR Conferences:
 The International Conference on Pattern Recognition
 2014—Stockholm, Sweden
 2016—Santiago, Chile
 2018—Beijing, China
 2020—Milan, Italy
 2022—Montreal, Canada
 The International Conference on Pattern Recognition in Bioinformatics 
 The International Conference on Pattern Recognition and Image Analysis
 The International Conference on Document Analysis and Recognition
 2013—Washington, DC, USA
 2015—Nancy, France
 2017—Kyoto, Japan
 2019—Sydney, Australia

The IAPR Fellow Award has been awarded biennially since 1994 to recognize distinguished contributions to the field of pattern recognition.

References

External links
 

Computer science organizations
Information technology organizations
International organizations based in the United States
International learned societies
Organizations established in 1976
Computer science-related professional associations